The magpie-jays are a genus, Calocitta, of the family Corvidae (crow-like birds) native to the southern part of North America. Sometimes placed in the genus Cyanocorax. The two known species are known to form hybrids.

The genus was introduced in 1841 by the English zoologist George Robert Gray with the white-throated magpie-jay (Calocitta formosa) as the type species. The name Calocitta combines the Ancient Greek kalos meaning "beautiful" and kitta meaning "jay".

Species 
The genus contains two species.

References

External links
 
 

Calocitta
Taxa named by George Robert Gray